Les Mars is a commune in the Creuse department in the Nouvelle-Aquitaine region in central France.

Geography

Population

Sights
 The thirteenth-century church.
 A restored feudal castle.
 The Château de Cherdon, at Chez-Redon.

See also
Communes of the Creuse department

References

Communes of Creuse